Holt is an unincorporated community and census-designated place (CDP) in Ingham County in the U.S. state of Michigan.  The CDP is located within Delhi Charter Township and occupies a majority of the township.  The population was 25,625 at the 2020 census, which is a significant increase from 11,315 at the 2000 census when the CDP area was significantly smaller.

Geography
Holt is the second most-populated CDP (after Forest Hills) and the fifth largest by area in the state of Michigan.

The community is south of Lansing, just south of I-96 between US-127 and M-99.

Holt is home to an ancient glacial esker.

History
The first permanent settlers of Delhi Township, John Norris and Fred Luther, arrived in 1837. In 1850, 402 settlers resided in the township. By 1857, Delhi Center (now Holt) had a post office, hotel, tavern, and several other businesses. The post office at Delhi Center was renamed "Holt" in 1860 to prevent confusion with Delhi Mills in Washtenaw County. Joseph Holt was the U.S. Postmaster General during that time.

The northern part of Holt was originally not part of the community and was a separate area known as "Five Corners" or "North Holt".

Demographics

As of the census of 2000, there were 11,315 people, 4,502 households, and 3,101 families residing in the CDP. The racial makeup of the CDP was 92.89% White, 2.43% Black or African American, 0.50% Native American, 1.03% Asian, 0.04% Pacific Islander, 0.95% from other races, and 2.15% from two or more races. Hispanic or Latino of any race were 3.63% of the population.

There were 4,502 households, out of which 38.5% had children under the age of 18 living with them, 49.3% were married couples living together, 15.0% had a female householder with no husband present, and 31.1% were non-families. 25.6% of all households were made up of individuals, and 7.0% had someone living alone who was 65 years of age or older.  The average household size was 2.51 and the average family size was 3.01.

In the CDP, the population was spread out, with 28.6% under the age of 18, 8.6% from 18 to 24, 31.4% from 25 to 44, 23.0% from 45 to 64, and 8.5% who were 65 years of age or older.  The median age was 34 years. For every 100 females, there were 91.3 males.  For every 100 females age 18 and over, there were 86.3 males.

The median income for a household in the CDP was $44,382, and the median income for a family was $52,528. Males had a median income of $41,322 versus $30,500 for females. The per capita income for the CDP was $21,733.  About 5.1% of families and 6.7% of the population were below the poverty line, including 8.9% of those under age 18 and 4.2% of those age 65 or over.

Education
Holt Public Schools is the local school district, which operates Holt High School.

Notable people
Lingg Brewer, Michigan state legislator
Harry A. DeMaso, Michigan state legislator
Tim Fedewa, NASCAR driver
Jim C. Hines, fantasy writer
Larry Nassar, former team doctor for the United States women's national gymnastics team and convicted sex offender.
Tina Rosenberg, Pulitzer-prize winning author
Alfie Turcotte, NHL player

References

Sources

External links

 Delhi Charter Township official website
 Holt-Delhi branch of the Capital Area District Library
 Holt-Delhi Historical Society
 Holt, Michigan at city-data.com

Unincorporated communities in Ingham County, Michigan
Census-designated places in Michigan
Lansing–East Lansing metropolitan area
Unincorporated communities in Michigan
Census-designated places in Ingham County, Michigan
Populated places established in 1860
1860 establishments in Michigan